David Littmann (July 28, 1906 – January 1, 1981) was an American cardiologist born in Chelsea, Massachusetts (born to Ukrainian immigrants from Novogrod Wolyn aka Zwill Ukraine (formally the Russian Empire), Issac Litman and Sadie Zewat Litman) and Harvard Medical School professor and researcher. The name Littmann is well known in the medical field for the patented Littmann Stethoscope reputed for its acoustic performances for auscultation.

With Gustev Machlup, Dr. David Littmann founded Cardiosonics, Inc. to sell his stethoscopes.  At that time the stethoscope line consisted of two key models, the doctor's stethoscope and the nurse's stethoscope.

3M acquired the stethoscope company on April 1, 1967, and hired Dr. Littmann as a consultant.  3M currently produces the range of Littmann brand stethoscopes.

The 1960s-era Littman Cardiology 3 stethoscope, which is out of patent, became the basis of a 3D-printed stethoscope developed by Dr. Tarek Loubani and a team of medical and technology specialists as part of the open source Glia project.

Dr. Littmann's son was jazz drummer Peter Littman (1935-1985).

References

External links 
3M Littmann Worldwide
Which stethoscope should you get
Comparison of Littmann Stethoscopes
How to Choose a Littmann Stethoscope Guide

1906 births
1981 deaths
American cardiologists
American people of Ukrainian-Jewish descent
Harvard Medical School faculty
20th-century American inventors